Ice hockey is the most popular indoor sport in Scotland, with a fairly established presence in each of the population centres and a spectator attendance lower only than football and rugby union. The term "hockey" is usually reserved for field hockey in Scotland, and "ice hockey" is normally referred to by its full form.

As with curling (a sport of Scottish origin), the game tends to be more commonly played indoors these days, due to milder winters in the past few decades. Ice hockey is thus played on indoor rinks in Scotland, with the possible exception of street hockey, which is played at an informal level within the country.

Governing body
The national governing body is Scottish Ice Hockey.

History

Shinty and the possible Scottish origins of ice hockey
Despite the official introduction of ice hockey into Scotland in the twentieth century, its roots in Scotland go far deeper. To this day, ice hockey is often referred to as "shinny" and "hurtling" in Canada, suggesting a tie up with shinty and Ireland's hurling. Shinty is the national stick game of Scotland, and Phil Dracket who favours an English origin for the game, in the Fens of Cambridgeshire admits:
"in the formative years of the game the dividing line between hockey, bandy and shinty was always a fine one."

In fact, Charles Goodman Tebbutt, who wrote down the first English bandy rules, claimed the words were interchangeable:

"THE game of bandy, otherwise known as hockey or shinney, or shinty, is doubtless one of the earliest pastimes of the kind ever known."

However, the similarities between the two sports, post-codification are still notable:
"[in shinty] as in ice hockey, both sides of the hook [of the stick] are used to strike the ball, but there is no restriction on the height to which the stick may be raised."

20th century

Domestic structure

See also
 Celtic League Cup

References

Bibliography
 Drackett, Phil Flashing Blades, the Story of British Ice Hockey, The Crowood Press Ltd; (12 October 1987)
 Hutchinson, Roger Camanachd!: The Story of Shinty, Birlinn Ltd (16 November 2004)
 MacLennan, Hugh Dan, Not an orchid, Kessock Communications (1995, Scotland)

External links
 A-Z of Ice Hockey

 
History of sport in Scotland
Scotland
Shinty